Delroy Poyser (5 January 1962 – 11 February 2019) was a Jamaican long jumper, who won the gold medal for his native country at the 1982 Central American and Caribbean Games in Havana, Cuba. He died on 11 February 2019, aged 57 after a long battle with cancer.

Achievements

References

1982 Year Rankings

1962 births
2019 deaths
Athletes (track and field) at the 1982 Commonwealth Games
Central American and Caribbean Games gold medalists for Jamaica
Commonwealth Games competitors for Jamaica
Deaths from cancer in Texas
Jamaican male long jumpers
People from Kingston, Jamaica
Competitors at the 1982 Central American and Caribbean Games
Central American and Caribbean Games medalists in athletics
20th-century Jamaican people
21st-century Jamaican people